Sorhagenia rhamniella is a moth in the family Cosmopterigidae. It is found in most of Europe, except the Balkan Peninsula.

The wingspan is about 9–10 mm. The head is fuscous, whitish sprinkled.
Forewings are fuscous, sometimes somewhat ochreous mixed; large blackish scale-tufts on fold at 1/4, on dorsum before tornus, below middle of costa, and in disc at 3/4; some raised black strigulae towards apex. Hindwings are grey. The larva is greenish; head and plate of 2 black.

Adults are on wing from July to August.

The larvae feed on Rhamnus frangula and Rhamnus cathartica. They feed from within a slight spinning either in the flowers or the terminal shoots. Sometimes, also young leaves are eaten. Pupation takes place in a pale yellow cocoon near the ground, sometimes between leaves. Larvae can be found from the beginning of May to June.

References

External links
lepiforum.de

Moths described in 1839
Chrysopeleiinae
Moths of Europe
Moths of Asia